Alan Cherkasov (Rus: Алан Черкасов) is a Kazakhstani television personality who rose to popularity as host of the third season of SuperStar KZ. Alan has also presented for channels Perviy Kanal Evraziya, 31 Kanal & HiT TV.

References

SuperStar KZ
Kazakhstani television presenters
Living people
Year of birth missing (living people)